Yao Junsheng (born 29 October 1995) is a Chinese professional footballer who currently plays as a left-footed midfielder for Zhejiang Professional.

Club career
Yao Junsheng joined Shandong Luneng Taishan's youth academy in 2006. He went to Portugal for further training in January 2014, and played for Sintrense, Real Massamá and Pinhalnovense between 2014 and 2016.

Yao was promoted to Shandong Luneng's first team squad by Felix Magath in July 2016. He was loaned to China League One side Meizhou Hakka for one season in February 2017. He made his debut for Meizhou on 11 March 2017 in a 2–0 home loss against Dalian Yifang. On 2 July 2017, Yao scored his first senior goal by penalty in a 1–1 away draw against Dalian Yifang. He scored five goals in 26 appearances in the 2017 season, which ensured Meizhou Hakka's stay in the second tier for another season.

Yao returned to Shandong Luneng in the 2018 season. On 4 March 2018, he made his Chinese Super League debut in a 3–0 home win over Beijing Sinobo Guoan. On 13 February 2019, Yao was loaned to fellow first-tier club Tianjin Tianhai for the 2019 season.

The following season he was loaned out again, this time to second tier club Zhejiang Energy Greentown where he made his debut in a league game on 24 October 2020 against Kunshan in a 2-0 victory. The club would miss out on promotion through the play-offs, however On 17 March 2021, Yao joined the China League One club on a permanent basis as they renamed themselves Zhejiang Professional. He would go on to establish himself as a vital member of the team as they gained promotion to the top tier at the end of the 2021 China League One season through a play-off victory against Qingdao.

International career
Yao made his debut for the Chinese national team on 10 September 2019 in a 5–0 win against the Maldives, coming on as a substitute for Hao Junmin in the 80th minute.

Career statistics

Club statistics
.

International statistics

References

External links
 

1995 births
Living people
Chinese footballers
Footballers from Zhejiang
Sportspeople from Wenzhou
C.D. Pinhalnovense players
Shandong Taishan F.C. players
Meizhou Hakka F.C. players
Tianjin Tianhai F.C. players
Segunda Divisão players
Chinese Super League players
China League One players
Association football midfielders
Chinese expatriate footballers
Expatriate footballers in Portugal
Chinese expatriate sportspeople in Portugal
Footballers at the 2018 Asian Games
S.U. Sintrense players
Asian Games competitors for China